The 1946–47 Division 2 season was the second tier of ice hockey in Sweden for that season. 43 teams participated, divided into six groups of six and one group of seven. Group winners Gävle GIK, Leksands IF, IFK Bofors, Västerås SK, Tranebergs IF, Atlas Diesels IF, and Djurgårdens IF advanced to a promotion tournament which resulted in Gävle GIK, Västerås, Traneberg, and Atlas Diesel being promoted to Division 1 for the following season.

Standings

North

Dalarna

West

Västmanland

Södermanland

East

South

Division 2 (Swedish ice hockey) seasons
2